Chihuly Garden and Glass is an exhibit in the Seattle Center directly next to the Space Needle, showcasing the studio glass of Dale Chihuly. It opened in May 2012 at the former site of the defunct Fun Forest amusement park.

The project features three primary components: the Garden, the Glasshouse, and the Interior Exhibits, with significant secondary spaces including a 90-seat café with additional outdoor dining, a 50-seat multi-use theater and lecture space, retail and lobby spaces, and extensive public site enhancements beyond the Garden. The 100-foot-long installation inside of the Glasshouse is one of Chihuly's largest suspended sculptures. Designed with the help of architect Owen Richards, the facility was awarded LEED silver certification from the USGBC.

Exhibitions
Chihuly Garden and Glass is the comprehensive exhibition dedicated to showcasing Chihuly's work.

See also
 List of single-artist museums

References

External links

2012 establishments in Washington (state)
Museums in Seattle
Art museums and galleries in Washington (state)
Glass museums and galleries in the United States
Seattle Center
Sculptures by Dale Chihuly
Sculptures in Seattle